Zeiraphera demutata is a species of moth of the family Tortricidae. It is found in China (Jilin, Heilongjiang, Henan, Shaanxi, Gansu), Korea, Japan and Russia.

The wingspan is 17–20 mm.

The larvae feed on Quercus mongolica.

References

Moths described in 1900
Eucosmini